The Holy Name Catholic Church in Kansas City, Missouri was a building from 1928. It was listed on the National Register of Historic Places in 2003.  The building was demolished in 2011.  Some of the exterior stone was used to repair the facade of St. Peter's church, also in Kansas City.

References

KansasCity HolyName
KansasCity HolyName
KansasCity HolyName
KansasCity HolyName
Roman Catholic churches in Kansas City, Missouri
KansasCity HolyName
KansasCity HolyName
National Register of Historic Places in Kansas City, Missouri
20th-century Roman Catholic church buildings in the United States